This is a list of banks in Africa, arranged by country.

Algeria

Central bank
 Bank of Algeria

Commercial public banks
 Algérie Poste
 Banque Capitale Du Benin

Commercial private banks

 Arab Bank
 Arab Banking Corporation
 Banque Capitale Du Benin
 BNP Paribas
 Calyon
 Citibank
 HSBC
 Natixis
 Société Générale

Angola

Central bank
 Central Bank of Angola

Commercial banks and other financial institutions
 Banco Africano de Investimentos
 Banco de Desenvolvimento de Angola
 Banco de Poupança e Crédito
 Banco do Brasil
 Banco do Comércio e Indústria
 Banco Espírito Santo Angola

Benin

Central bank
 Central Bank of West African States

Banks and other financial institutions
 African Investment Bank
 Bank of Africa Bénin
 Banque Atlantique
 Banque Internationale du Bénin
 Banque Sahélo-Saharienne pour l'Investissement et le Commerce
 BGFIBank Group
 Diamond Bank
 Ecobank	
 Financial Bank Bénin
 Société Générale
 United Bank for Africa

Botswana

Central bank
 Bank of Botswana

Development banks
 Botswana Savings Bank

Commercial banks

 ABN AMRO
 ABN AMRO OBU
 BancABC
 Bank Gaborone
 Bank of Baroda
 Barclays Bank
 Capital Bank (Botswana)
First National Bank of Botswana
 Stanbic Bank
 Standard Chartered Bank

Burkina Faso

Central bank
 Central Bank of West African States

Commercial banks

 Bank of Africa
 Banque Atlantique
 Banque Sahélo-Saharienne pour l'Investissement et le Commerce
 Ecobank
 Société Générale
 United Bank for Africa

Burundi

Central bank
 Bank of the Republic of Burundi, or Banque de la République du Burundi

Banks

 Access Bank plc,  Finbank
 Bank of Africa
 Banque Belgo – Africaine
 Diamond Trust Bank Group
 Ecobank
 Interbank Burundi
 Kenya Commercial Bank
 United Bank for Africa

Cameroon

Central bank
 Bank of Central African States

Commercial banks

 Afriland First Bank
 Banque Atlantique
 Citibank
 Commercial Bank of Cameroon
 Credit Agricole
 Credit Communautaire D'Afrique
 Crédit Lyonnais
 Ecobank
 National Financial Credit Bank
 Oceanic Bank
 Société Générale
 Standard Chartered Bank
 Union Bank of Cameroon
 United Bank for Africa

Cape Verde

Central bank
 Bank of Cape Verde, or Banco de Cabo Verde

Banks and other financial institutions
 Banco Africano de Investimentos
 Banco Cabo-Verdiano de Negócios
 Banco Comercial do Atlântico
 Banco Espirito Santo
 Banco Inter-Atlântico
 Caixa Económica de Cabo Verde
 Caixa Geral de Depositos
 Ecobank

Central African Republic

Central bank
 Bank of Central African States, or Banque des États de l'Afrique Centrale

Banks
 Banque Internationale pour le Centrafrique
 Banque Populaire Maroco-Centrafricaine
 Commercial Bank Centrafrique
 Ecobank

Chad

Central bank
 Bank of Central African States

Banks and other financial institutions

 Banque Arabe Soudano – Tchadienne
 Banque Sahélo-Saharienne pour l'Investissement et le Commerce
Commercial Bank of Tchad
 Ecobank

Microfinance institutions
 Catholic Relief Services

Comoros

Central bank
 Central Bank of the Comoros (Banque Centrale des Comores)

Commercial bank
 Exim Bank Comores SA

Democratic Republic of the Congo

Central bank
 Central Bank of the Congo

Commercial banks

 Access Bank plc,  Banque Privée Du Congo
 Advans Banque Congo
 Afriland First Bank
 Banque Commerciale du Congo, Kinshasa
BGFIBank DRC
 Citibank
 Ecobank
 Equity Bank
 First International Bank
 Procredit Bank
 Rawbank
 Stanbic Bank
 Trust Merchant Bank
 United Bank for Africa

Microfinance institution
 FINCA International

Djibouti

Central bank
 Central Bank of Djibouti, or Banque Centrale de Djibouti

Commercial banks

 Banque de Djibouti et du Moyen Orient SA
 Banque Indosuez Mer Rouge
 Banque pour le Commerce et l'Industrie - Mer Rouge
 CAC International Bank
 International Commercial Bank
 Salam African Bank

Egypt

Central bank
 Central Bank of Egypt (Al-Bank al-Markazī al-Masrī)

Banks
 Ahli United Bank
 Al Watany Bank of Egypt
 Arab Bank
 Arab Banking Corporation
 Bank Audi
 Bank of Alexandria
 Bank of Nova Scotia
 Banque du Caire
 Banque Misr
 Barclays Bank
 BNP Paribas
 Citibank
 Commercial International Bank
 Crédit Agricole
 HSBC
 Mashreq Bank
 National Bank of Abu Dhabi
 National Bank of Egypt
 National Bank of Greece
 National Bank of Oman
 Piraeus Bank
 Société Générale
 Union National Bank

Equatorial Guinea

Central bank
 Bank of Central African States, or Banques des États de l'Afrique Centrale

Banks
 Afriland First Bank d.b.a. CCEI BANK GE
 BGFIBank Equatorial Guinea
 Commercial Bank Guinee Equatoriale

Eritrea

Central bank
 Bank of Eritrea

Commercial banks
 Commercial Bank of Eritrea
 Eritrean Investment and Development Bank

Ethiopia

Central bank
 National Bank of Ethiopia

Banks
 Abay Bank S.C.
 Addis International Bank
 Awash International Bank
 Bank of Abyssinia
 Berhan International Bank
 Bunna International Bank
 Commercial Bank of Ethiopia
 Cooperative Bank of Oromia
 Dashen Bank
 Debub Global Bank
 Development Bank of Ethiopia
 Enat Bank
 Lion International Bank
 Nib International Bank
 Oromia International Bank
 United Bank
 Wegagen Bank
 Zemen Bank

Microfinance institution
 Amhara Microfinance

Gabon

Central bank
 Bank of Central African States

Banks and other financial institutions
 Banque Gabonaise de Développement
 BGFIBank Group
 Citibank
 Ecobank

Gambia

Central bank

 Central Bank of The Gambia

Commercial banks

 Access Bank plc
 Arab Gambian Islamic Bank
 Bank PHB
 Banque Sahélo-Saharienne pour l'Investissement et le Commerce
 Ecobank
 First International Bank
 Guaranty Trust Bank
 International Commercial Bank
 Prime Bank (Gambia)
 Skye Bank
 Standard Chartered Bank
 Tong Shang International Commercial Bank
 Trust Bank Limited (Gambia)
 Zenith Bank

Ghana

Central bank
 Bank of Ghana

Commercial banks
 Absa Bank Ghana (formerly Barclays Bank of Ghana Limited)
 Access Bank plc
 African Investment Bank
 Agricultural Development Bank of Ghana
 AmalBank
 Bank of Baroda
 Banque Sahélo-Saharienne pour l'Investissement et le Commerce
 CAL Bank
 Consolidated Bank of Ghana
 Ecobank Ghana
 First National Bank Ghana
 Fidelity Bank Ghana
 Ghana Commercial Bank
 Guaranty Trust Bank
 Home Finance Company
 Intercontinental Bank
 International Commercial Bank
 National Investment Bank
 Prudential Bank Limited
 Société Générale - Social Security Bank
 Stanbic Bank
 Standard Chartered Bank
 United Bank for Africa
 Zenith Bank

Rural bank
 Atwima Rural Bank Ltd
 Bonzali Rural Bank

Guinea

Central bank
 Central Bank of the Republic of Guinea (Banque Centrale de la Republique du Guinea)

Banks and other financial institutions

 AFBG - Afriland First Bank Guinée
 Banque Internationale pour l'Afrique en Guinee
 BCI - Banque pour le Commerce et l'Industrie Guinée
 BDG - Banque pour le Développement Guinée
 BICIGUI - Banque Internationale pour le Commerce et l'Industrie de la Guinée (BNP Paribas group)
 BIG - Banque Islamique de Guinée
 BNG - Banque Nationale de Guinée
 BPMG - Banque Populaire Maroco Guinéenne (subsidiary Banque Populaire (Morocco))
 BSIC - Banque Sahélo-Saharienne pour l'Investissement et le Commerce
 Ecobank Guinee
 FBNBank Guinée (filiale First Bank of Nigeria)
 International Commercial Bank
 NSIA -
 Oorabank
 Skye Bank Guinée
 SGBG - Société Générale de Banque en Guinée
 UBA - (United Bank for Africa - subsidiary of United Bank for Africa)
 Vistabank

Guinea-Bissau

Central bank
 Central Bank of West African States (Banque Centrale des États de l'Afrique de l'Ouest)

Banks

 Banco Da Africa Ocidental
 Ecobank

Ivory Coast

Central bank
 Central Bank of West African States

Banks and other financial institutions

 Atlantic Bank Group
 Bank of Africa	
 Bridge Bank Group – Côte d'Ivoire
 Citibank	
 Ecobank
 Société Générale
 Standard Chartered Bank

Kenya

Central bank
 Central Bank of Kenya

Commercial banks

 ABC Bank (Kenya)
 Bank of Africa (Kenya)
 Bank of Baroda
 Bank of India
 Barclays Bank (Kenya)
 CfC Stanbic Holdings
 Chase Bank (Kenya)
 Citibank
 Commercial Bank of Africa
 Consolidated Bank of Kenya
 Cooperative Bank of Kenya
 Credit Bank
 Development Bank of Kenya
 Diamond Trust Bank
 Dubai Bank Kenya 
 Ecobank Transnational
 Equatorial Commercial Bank
 Equity Bank Kenya
 Family Bank
 Fidelity Commercial Bank Limited
 First Community Bank
 Giro Commercial Bank
 Guaranty Trust Bank (Kenya)
 Guardian Bank
 Gulf African Bank
 Bank AL Habib
 Habib Bank AG Zurich
 Housing Finance Company of Kenya
 I&M Bank
 Imperial Bank Kenya
 Jamii Bora Bank
 K-Rep Bank
 Kenya Commercial Bank
 Middle East Bank Kenya
 National Bank of Kenya
 NIC Bank
 Oriental Commercial Bank
 Paramount Universal Bank
 Prime Bank (Kenya)
 Standard Chartered Kenya
 Trans National Bank Kenya
 United Bank for Africa
 Victoria Commercial Bank

Representative offices of foreign banks
List of representative offices of foreign banks in Kenya:

 Bank of China
 Bank of Kigali
 Central Bank of India
 FirstRand Bank
 HDFC Bank
 Hong Kong and Shanghai Banking Corporation 
 Nedbank

Deposit-accepting microfinance institutions
 Kenya Women Microfinance Bank
 Faulu Microfinance Bank Limited
 One Acre Fund

Investment banks
This is a list of investment banks and stockbrokerage firms in Kenya:

 ABC Bank (Kenya)
 African Alliance Kenya Investment Bank 
 Afrika Investment Bank 
 ApexAfrica Capital 
 Chase Bank (Kenya) 
 Commercial Bank of Africa
 Cooperative Bank of Kenya
 Discount Securities
 Dyer & Blair Investment Bank
 Equity Bank Group
 Faida Investment Bank 
 Francis Drummond & Company 
 Kestrel Capital
 Ngenye Kariuki & Co 
 NIC Bank Group
 Old Mutual
 Renaissance Capital
 SBG Securities 
 Standard Investment Bank 
 Sterling Capital 
 Suntra Investment Bank

Lesotho

Central bank
 Central Bank of Lesotho

Commercial banks

 First National Bank (South Africa)
 Nedbank
 Standard Bank

Liberia

Central bank
 Central Bank of Liberia

Investment banks
 The Liberian Bank for Development & Investment

Commercial banks

 Access Bank Liberia
Ecobank Liberia
 First International Bank (Liberia)
 Global Bank Liberia
 Guaranty Trust Bank
 International Bank
 Liberian Bank for Development and Investment
 United Bank for Africa

Libya

Central bank
 Central Bank of Libya

Banks

 Alsaraya Trading And Development Bank
 Banque Sahélo-Saharienne pour l'Investissement et le Commerce
 Libyan Arab Foreign Bank
 National Agricultural Bank of Libya
 National Commercial Bank
 Sahara Bank
 Umma Bank

Madagascar

Central bank
 Central Bank of Madagascar

Commercial banks

 Access Bank plc
 BNI Madagascar
 Bank of Africa
 BGFIBank Group
 MCB Madagascar 
 Société Générale
 State Bank of Mysore

Malawi

Central bank
 Reserve Bank of Malawi

Banks

 CDH Investment Bank
 Ecobank
 FDH Bank
 First Merchant Bank
 National Bank of Malawi
 NBS Bank
 Nedbank
 New Finance Bank (NFB)
 Opportunity International
 Standard Bank

Mali

Central bank
 Central Bank of West African States

Commercial banks

 Bank of Africa	
 Banque Atlantique
 Banque de l'Habitat du Mali
 Banque du Développement du Mali
 Banque Nationale de Développement Agricole	
 Banque Sahélo-Saharienne pour l'Investissement et le Commerce
 Ecobank

Mauritania

Central bank
 Central Bank of Mauritania, or Banque Centrale de Mauritanie

Banks

 BNP Paribas
 Attijariwafa Bank
 Société Générale Mauritanie

Mauritius

Central bank
 Bank of Mauritius

Commercial banks

 Absa Bank (Mauritius) Limited - previously known as Barclays Bank Mauritius until 10 February 2020
 AfrAsia Bank
 Bank of Baroda
 Bank One Mauritius
 Deutsche Bank
 HBL Pakistan
 Hongkong Shanghai Banking Corporation
 Investec Bank
 MauBank
 Mauritius Commercial Bank
 Standard Bank
 Standard Chartered Bank
 State Bank of India ( International )
 State Bank of Mauritius

Morocco

Central bank
 Bank Al-Maghrib

Major banks
 Attijariwafa Bank
 Banque Marocaine du Commerce Extérieur
 BMCI
 Crédit Agricole
 CIH
 Groupe Banque Populaire
 Société Générale

Investment banks
 Capital Trust
 CDG Capital

Other banks
 ABN AMRO
 Citibank
 Commerzbank

Mozambique

Central bank
 Bank of Mozambique, or Banco de Moçambique

Banks and other financial institutions
 BancABC
 Banco Nacional de Investimentos
 BCI - Banco Comercial de Investimentos
 Banco Unico
 Barclays Bank
 First National Bank (South Africa)
 International Commercial Bank
 MCB Group
 
 Opportunity International
 Procredit Bank
 Standard Bank

Namibia

Central bank

 Bank of Namibia

Investment Banks
 Investec Bank

Commercial banks

 Bank BIC
 Bank Windhoek
 First National Bank (South Africa)
 Letshego Bank
 Nedbank
 Standard Bank
 Trustco Bank (FIDES Bank Namibia)

Niger

Central bank
 Central Bank of West African States

Banks and other financial institutions
 
 Bank of Africa
 Banque Agricole
 Banque Atlantique
 Banque Commerciale du Niger
 Banque de l'Habitat du Niger
 Banque Islamique du Niger
 Banque Sahélo-Saharienne pour l'Investissement et le Commerce
 BIA Niger
 CORIS Banque
 Ecobank
 Orabank

Nigeria

Central bank
 Central Bank of Nigeria

Commercial Banks with International Authorization

 AAA Finance and Investment Company
 Abbey Mortgage Bank
 Access Bank
 AG Mortgage Bank Plc
 Akwa Savings And Loans Limited
 Brent Mortgage Bank
 Citibank
 Cooperative Mortgage Bank
 Coronation Merchant Bank
 County Finance Limited
 De Delta Trust Mortgage Bank
 EH FHA Mortgage Bank
 ER Ecobank PLC
 FBN Mortgage Bank (First Trust Mortgage Bank)
 Fbnquest Merchant Bank
 FFS Micro finance Bank 
 Fidelity Bank
 First Bank Of Nigeria
 First City Monumnet Bank 
 First Generation Mortgage Bank
 Gateway Mortgage Bank
 Globus Bank
 Greenwich Merchant Bank
 Gtbank Plc
 Haggai Mortgage Bank Limited
 Hedonmark
 Heritage
 Homebase Mortgage Bank
 Imperial Homes Mortgage Bank
 Infinity Trust Mortgage Bank
 Interland Mortgage Bank
 Jaiz Bank
 Jessefield Microfinance
 Jubilee Life Mortgage Bank
 Keystone Bank
 Lagos Building Investment Company
 Living Trust Mortgage Bank
 Lotus Bank
 Mayfresh Mortgage Bank Ltd
 Mkudi
 New Prudential Bank
 Nip Virtual Bank
 Nova Merchant Bank
 Optimus Bank
 Parallex Bank
 Platinum Mortgage Bank
 Polaris Bank
 Premiumtrust Bank
 Premiumtrust Bank
 Providus Bank
 Rand Merchant Bank
 Refuge Mortgage Bank
 Safe Trust Mortgage Bank
 Signature Bank
 Stanbic Ibtc Bank
 Standard Chartered Bank
 Stb Mortgage Bank
 Sterling Bank
 Sun Trust Bank
 Taj Bank
 Titan Trust Bank
 Titan-Paystack
 Trustbond Mortgage Bank (First Trust Mortgage Bank)
 Un Unity Bank
 Union Bank
 United Bank For Africa
 University Of Nigeria, Nsukka Microfinance
 Wema Bank

Microfinance Banks
 Ab Micro Finance BankMFB
 Abu Micro Finance BankMFB
 Abucoop Micro Finance BankMFB
 Abulesoro Micro Finance BankMFB
 Accion Micro Finance BankMFB
 Addosser Micro Finance BankMFB
 Adeyemicollege Staff Micro Finance BankMFB
 Advans La Fayette Micro Finance BankMFB
 Afekhafe Micro Finance BankMFB
 Afemai Micro Finance BankMFB
 Agosasa Micro Finance BankMFB
 Aku Micro Finance BankMFB
 Akuchukwu Micro Finance BankMFB
 Al Ally Micro Finance BankMFB
 Al-Barakah Micro Finance BankMFB
 Alekun Micro Finance BankMFB
 Alert Micro Finance BankMFB
 Allworkers Micro Finance BankMFB
 Alpha Kapital Micro Finance BankMFB
 Alvana Micro Finance BankMFB
 Amju Unique Micro Finance BankMFB
 Amml Micro Finance BankMFB
 Ampers and Micro Finance BankMFB
 Anchorage Micro Finance BankMFB
 Apeks Micro Finance BankMFB
 Apple micro financebankMFB
 Aramoko Micro Finance BankMFB
 Aspire Micro Finance BankMFB
 Asset Matrix Micro Finance BankMFB
 Assets Micro Finance BankMFB
 Astrapolaris Micro Finance BankMFB
 Atbu Micro Finance BankMFB
 Auchi Micro Finance BankMFB
 Az Aztec Micro Finance BankMFB
 Baines Credit Micro Finance BankMFB
 Balera Micro Finance BankMFB
 Balogun Fulani Micro Finance BankMFB
 Balogun Gambari Micro Finance BankMFB
 Banex Micro Finance BankMFB
 Baobab Micro Finance BankMFB
 Bc Kash Micro Finance BankMFB
 Benysta Micro Finance BankMFB
 Bipc Micro Finance BankMFB
 Bishopgate Micro Finance BankMFB
 Blueprint Investments Micro Finance BankMFB
 Bo BojibojiMicro Finance BankMFB
 Bo Micro Finance BankMFB
 Boctrust Micro Finance BankMFB
 Bosak Micro Finance BankMFB
 Bowen Micro Finance BankMFB
 Bridgeway Micro Finance BankMFB
 Brightway Micro Finance BankMFB
 Broadview Micro Finance BankMFB
 Bu Bubayero Mico finance BankMFB
 Capitalmetriq Swift Micro finance BankMFB
 Capstone Micro Finance BankMFB
 Cashconnect Micro Finance BankMFB
 Catland Micro Finance BankMFB
 Cedar Micro Finance BankMFB
 Cemcs Micro Finance BankMFB
 Ch Chibueze Micro Finance BankMFB
 Chanelle Micro Finance BankMFB
 Chase Micro Finance BankMFB
 Chikum Micro Finance BankMFB
 Chukwunenye Micro Finance BankMFB
 Cintrust Micro Finance BankMFB
 Cit Micro Finance BankMFB
 Citizen Trust Micro Finance BankMFB
 Cloverleaf Micro Finance BankMFB
 Co CoalcampMicro Finance BankMFB
 Co Corestep Micro Finance BankMFB
 Coastline Micro Finance BankMFB
 Confidence Micro Finance BankMFB
 Consistent Trust Micro Finance BankMFB
 Consumer Micro Finance BankMFB
 Covenant Micro Finance BankMFB
 Cr Crescent Micro Finance BankMFB
 Credit Afrique Micro Finance BankMFB
 Crutech Micro Finance BankMFB
 Da Davodani Micro Finance BankMFB
 Daylight Micro Finance BankMFB
 Do Dot Micro Finance BankMFB
 Eagle Flight Micro Finance BankMFB
 E-Barcs Micro Finance BankMFB
 Ebsu Micro Finance BankMFB
 Edfin Micro Finance BankMFB
 Egwafin Micro Finance BankMFB
 Ek EkondoMicro Finance BankMFB
 Ek Reliable Micro Finance BankMFB
 Ekimogun Micro Finance BankMFB
 Em Emeralds Micro Finance BankMFB
 Em EmpireMicro Finance BankMFB
 En EnrichMicro Finance BankMFB
 Esan Micro Finance BankMFB
 Eso E Micro Finance BankMFB
 Ev Evangel Micro Finance BankMFB
 Evergreen Micro Finance BankMFB
 Ew Ewt Micro Finance BankMFB
 Excellent Micro Finance BankMFB
 Eyowo Micro Finance BankMFB
 Fairmoney Micro Finance BankMFB
 Fast Micro Finance BankMFB
 . Federal University Dutse Micro Finance BankMFB
 Fedeth Micro Finance BankMFB
 FFS Micro finance Bank 
 Fidifund Micro Finance BankMFB
 Fims Micro Finance BankMFB
 Fina Trust Micro Finance BankMFB
 Finca Micro Finance BankMFB
 Firmus micro finance bankMFB
 First Heritage Micro Finance BankMFB
 First Midas Micro Finance BankMFB
 First Multiple Micro Finance BankMFB
 First Royal Micro Finance BankMFB
 Foresight Micro Finance BankMFB
 Fortress Micro Finance BankMFB
 Fullrange Micro Finance BankMFB
 Ga GarkiMicro Finance BankMFB
 Gabsyn Micro Finance BankMFB
 Gbede Micro Finance BankMFB
 Girei Micro Finance BankMFB
 Gmb Micro Finance BankMFB
 Good Neighbours Micro Finance BankMFB
 Goodnews Microfinance Bank MFB
 Gowans Micro Finance BankMFB
 Gr Grooming Micro Finance BankMFB
 Green Energy Micro Finance BankMFB
 Greenbank Micro Finance BankMFB
 Greenville Micro Finance BankMFB
 Gti Micro Finance BankMFB
 Ha Hackman Micro Finance BankMFB
 Ha Halalcredit Micro Finance BankMFB
 Hasal Micro Finance BankMFB
 Highland Micro Finance BankMFB
 Iba Micro Finance BankMFB
 Ibeto Micro Finance BankMFB
 Ibile Micro Finance BankMFB
 Ibom Fadama Micro Finance BankMFB
 Ibu-Aje Micro Finance BankMFB
 Ic-Global Micro Finance BankMFB
 Ikenne Micro Finance BankMFB
 Ikire Micro Finance BankMFB
 Ikoyi-Osun Micro Finance BankMFB
 Ilaro Poly Micro Finance BankMFB
 Ilisan Micro Finance BankMFB
 Imo State Micro Finance BankMFB
 Imowo Micro Finance BankMFB
 Infinity Micro Finance BankMFB
 Iperu Micro Finance BankMFB
 Irl Micro Finance BankMFB
 Isale Oyo Micro Finance BankMFB
 Iwoama Micro Finance BankMFB
 Iyamoye Micro Finance BankMFB
 Iyeru Okin Micro Finance Bank LtdMFB
 Kadpoly Micro Finance BankMFB
 Kayvee Micro Finance BankMFB
 Kcmb Micro Finance BankMFB
 Kenechukwu Micro Finance BankMFB
 Kingdom College Micro Finance BankMFB
 Kontagora Micro Finance BankMFB
 Kredi Money Micro Finance Bank LtdMFB
 Ku Kuda Micro Finance BankMFB
 Kwasu Micro Finance BankMFB
 La Lavender Micro Finance BankMFB
 Landgold Micro Finance BankMFB
 Lapo Micro Finance BankMFB
 Legend Micro Finance BankMFB
 Liebu-Ife Micro Finance BankMFB
 Lifegate Micro Finance BankMFB
 Light Micro Finance BankMFB
 Links Micro Finance BankMFB
 Lobrem Micro Finance BankMFB
 Lovonus Micro Finance BankMFB
 Mainstreet Micro Finance BankMFB
 Malachy Micro Finance BankMFB
 Manny Micro Finance BankMFB
 Mayfair Micro Finance BankMFB
 Me MeridianMicro Finance BankMFB
 Memphis Micro Finance BankMFB
 Mercury Micro Finance BankMFB
 Mgbidi Micro Finance BankMFB
 Microbiz Micro Finance BankMFB
 Microvis Micro Finance BankMFB
 Midland Micro Finance BankMFB
 Mkobo Micro Finance BankMFB
 MolusiMicro Finance BankMFB
 Monarch Micro Finance BankMFB
 Money Trust Micro Finance BankMFB
 Moniepoint Micro Finance Bank
 Mozfin Micro Finance BankMFB
 Mutual Benefits Micro Finance BankMFB
 Mutual Trust Micro Finance BankMFB
 Nagarta Micro Finance BankMFB
 Nasarawa Micro Finance BankMFB
 Ndiorah Micro Finance BankMFB
 Neptune Micro Finance BankMFB
 New Dawn Micro Finance BankMFB
 Nice Micro Finance BankMFB
 Nigeria Prisons Micro Finance BankMFB
 Nigerian Navy Micro Finance BankMFB
 Nirsal Micro Finance BankMFB
 Nkpolu-Ust Micro Finance BankMFB
 Npf Micro Finance BankMFB
 Ns NsukMicro Finance BankMFB
 Numo Micorfinance Bank
 Nuture Micro Finance BankMFB
 Nwannegadi Micro Finance BankMFB
 Oa Oakland Micro Finance BankMFB
 Oa OauMicro Finance BankMFB
 Oc Octopus Micro Finance BankMFB
 Oche Micro Finance BankMFB
 Oh Ohafia Micro Finance BankMFB
 Oj Ojokoro Micro Finance BankMFB
 Ok Oke-Aro Oredegbe Micro Finance BankMFB
 Ok Okuku Micro Finance BankMFB
 Ol Olofin-Owena Micro Finance BankMFB
 Olabisi Onabanjo University Micro Finance BankMFB
 Oluchukwu Micro Finance BankMFB
 Oluyole Micro Finance BankMFB
 Omiye Micro Finance BankMFB
 Or OrisunMicro Finance BankMFB
 Or Orokam Micro Finance BankMFB
 Oraukwu Micro Finance BankMFB
 Otech Micro Finance BankMFB
 Otuo Micro Finance BankMFB
 Page Micro Finance BankankMFB
 Palmcoast Micro Finance BankMFB
 Patrickgold Micro Finance BankMFB
 Pecantrust Micro Finance BankMFB
 Pennywise Micro Finance BankMFB
 Personal Trust Micro Finance BankMFB
 Petra Micro Finance BankMFB
 Pillar Micro Finance BankMFB
 Po Polybadan Micro Finance BankMFB
 Preeminent Micro Finance BankMFB
 Prestige Micro Finance BankMFB
 Prisco Micro Finance BankMFB
 Pristine Divitis Micro Finance BankMFB
 Projects Micro Finance BankMFB
 Qu QubeMicro Finance BankMFB
 Qu Quickfund Micro Finance BankMFB
 Rahama Micro Finance BankMFB
 Randalpha Micro Finance BankMFB
 Regent Micro Finance BankMFB
 Rehoboth Micro Finance BankMFB
 Reliance Micro Finance BankMFB
 Renmoney Micro Finance BankMFB
 Renmoney Micro Finance BankMFB
 Rephidim Micro Finance BankMFB
 Richway Micro Finance BankMFB
 Richway Micro Finance BankMFB
 Rigo Micro Finance BankMFB
 Rigo Micro Finance BankMFB
 Rima Growth Pathway Micro Finance BankMFB
 Rima Micro Finance BankMFB
 Ro Rockshield Micro Finance BankMFB
 Royal Exchange Micro Finance BankMFB
 Royal Exchange Micro Finance BankMFB
 Rubies Micro Finance BankMFB
 Rubies Micro Finance BankMFB
 Sa Safegate Micro Finance BankMFB
 Safe Haven Micro Finance BankMFB
 Safe Haven Micro Finance BankMFB
 Safegate Micro Finance BankMFB
 Sagamu Micro Finance BankMFB
 Seap Micro Finance BankMFB
 Seap Micro Finance BankMFB
 Seed Capital Micro Finance BankMFB
 Seedvest Micro Finance Bank LtdMFB
 Sh Shalom Micro Finance BankMFB
 Sh Shepherd Trust Micro Finance BankMFB
 Sh Shield Micro Finance BankMFB
 Shongom Micro Finance BankMFB
 Sls Micro Finance BankMFB
 Sn Snow Micro Finance BankMFB
 Solid Allianze Micro Finance BankMFB
 Solidrock Micro Finance BankMFB
 Spectrum Micro Finance BankMFB
 Standard Micro Finance BankMFB
 Stanford Micro Finance BankMFB
 Stateside Micro Finance BankMFB
 Stellas Micro Finance BankMFB
 Sunbeam Micro Finance BankMFB
 Support Micro Finance BankMFB
 Supreme Micro Finance BankMFB
 Tanadi Micro Finance BankMFB
 Tc TcfMicro Finance BankMFB
 Th Think Finance Micro Finance BankMFB
 Thrive Micro Finance BankMFB
 Tr Triplea Micro Finance BankMFB
 Trident Micro Finance BankMFB
 Trust Micro Finance BankMFB
 Trustbanc J6 Micro Finance Bank LimitedMFB
 Trustfund Micro Finance BankMFB
 U& C Micro Finance BankMFB
 Uda Micro Finance BankMFB
 Uhuru Micro Finance BankMFB
 Um Umunnachi Micro Finance BankMFB
 Unaab Micro Finance BankMFB
 Unical Micro Finance BankMFB
 Unilag Micro Finance BankMFB
 Unimaid Micro Finance BankMFB
 UniuyoMicro Finance BankMFB
 Verdant Micro Finance BankMFB
 Vfd Micro Finance BankMFB
 Visa Micro Finance BankMFB
 Wade Micro Finance BankMFB
 Waya Micro Finance BankMFB
 Wetland Micro Finance BankMFB
 Xsince Micro Finance BankMFB
 Yct Micro Finance BankMFB
 Yes Micro Finance BankMFB

Non-interest Banks
Jaiz Bank Plc
Taj Bank Limited

Merchant Banks
 Coronation Merchant Bank
 Fbnquest Merchant Bank
 Greenwich Merchant Bank
 Mercury Micro Finance BankMFB
 Nova Merchant Bank
 Rand Merchant Bank

Congo

Central bank
 Bank of Central African States

Commercial banks

 Afriland First Bank
 Attijariwafa Bank
 Banque Espírito Santo
 Banque Postale du Congo
 Banque Sino-Congolaise pour l’Afrique
 BGFIBank Group
 Ecobank
 Groupe Banque Populaire
 Mutuelles congolaises d'épargne et de crédit (MUCODEC)
 Société Générale Congo
 UBA Congo

Rwanda

Central bank
 National Bank of Rwanda

Development banks
 Rwanda Development Bank

Commercial banks

 Access Bank Rwanda
 Bank of Kigali
 Banque Populaire du Rwanda SA
 Commercial Bank of Rwanda
 Compagnie Générale de Banque
 Ecobank Rwanda
 Equity Bank
 Guaranty Trust Bank (Rwanda)
 Housing Bank of Rwanda
 KCB Rwanda
 Urwego Opportunity Bank

São Tomé and Príncipe

Central bank
 Central Bank of São Tomé and Príncipe

Banks

 Afriland First Bank
 Banco Internacional da Sao Tomé e Príncipe
 Commercial Bank of São Tomé and Príncipe
 Ecobank
 National Investment Bank
 Oceanic Bank

Senegal

Central bank
 Central Bank of West African States

Banks

 Banque Atlantique Senegal (Banque Atlantique)
 Bank of Africa - Senegal (BOA)
 Banque de Dakar (BDK), BDK Financial Group
 Banque De L'Habitat Du Senegal (BHS)
 Banque Des Institutions Mutualistes D’Afrique de L’Ouest (BIMAO)
 Banque Internationale pour le Commerce Et L’Industrie Du Senegal (BICIS)
 Banque Islamique Du Senegal (BIS)
 Banque Nationale pour le Développement Economique (BNDE)
 Banque pour le Commerce et L’Industrie Du Mali (BCI)
 Banque Régionale De Marchés (BRM)
 Banque Sahélo-Saharienne pour l’Investissement et le Commerce (BSIC)
 BGFIBank Senegal (BGFI)
 Caisse Nationale de Crédit Agricole du Senegal (CNCAS)
 Compagnie Bancaire de l'Afrique Occidentale (CBAO), Attijariwafa Bank Group
 Citibank
 Coris Bank
 Crédit Du Senegal (CDS), Attijariwafa Bank Group
 Crédit International (CI), Crédit Libanais Group
 Ecobank
 First Bank of Nigeria (FBN)
 La Banque Outarde (LBO)
 NSIA Bank, previously known as Diamond Bank
 Orabank, part of Oragroup
 Société Générale de Banques au Senegal (SGBS), Société Générale Group
 United Bank For Africa (UBA)

Seychelles

Central bank
 Central Bank of Seychelles

Commercial banks

 Bank Al Habib
 Bank of Baroda
 Bank of Ceylon
 Barclays Bank
 HBL Pakistan
 MCB Group

Sierra Leone

Central bank
 Bank of Sierra Leone

Commercial banks

 Access Bank plc
 Ecobank
 First International Bank
 Guaranty Trust Bank
 International Commercial Bank
 Rokel Commercial Bank
 Sierra Leone Commercial Bank
 Skye Bank
 Standard Chartered Bank
 Union Trust Bank
 United Bank for Africa
 Zenith Bank

Somalia

Central bank
 Central Bank of Somalia

Commercial banks

 Agro Africa Bank
 Amal Bank
 Commercial and Savings Bank of Somalia
 Dara-Salaam Bank
 Dahabshil bank
 Daryeel Bank Limited
 First Somali Bank
 International Bank of Somalia
 My Bank Limited
 National Bank of Somalia
 Premier Bank
 Salaam Somali Bank
 Somali Bank Limited
 Somali Commercial Bank
 Trust African Bank
 Universal Bank of Somalia
 Ziraat Katilim

South Africa

Central bank
 South African Reserve Bank

Locally controlled banks

 African Bank Limited
 Bidvest Bank
 Capitec Bank
 First National Bank (South Africa)
 FirstRand Bank
 Grindrod Bank
 Imperial Bank South Africa	
 Investec	
 Nedbank	
 Sasfin Bank
 Standard Bank
 Teba Bank Limited
 TymeBank

Foreign-controlled banks
 Absa Group
 Habib Bank AG Zurich
 HBL Pakistan

Branches of foreign banks
 Bank of Baroda	
 Bank of China 	
 Bank of Taiwan
 Calyon
 China Construction Bank Corporation
 Citibank
 Deutsche Bank
 HSBC
 JPMorgan Chase Bank
 Royal Bank of Scotland
 Société Générale
 South African Bank of Athens (99.79% subsidiary of National Bank of Greece)
 Standard Chartered Bank
 State Bank of India

Other banks
 Development Bank of Southern Africa
 Land and Agricultural Development Bank of South Africa
 Postbank South Africa

Sudan

Central bank
 Central Bank of Sudan

Commercial banks

 Abu Dhabi Islamic Bank
 Agricultural Bank Sudan
 Al Shamal Islamic Bank
 Aljazeera Sudanese Jordanian Bank
 Alkhaleej Bank
 Alnile Bank
 Alsalam Bank 
 Animal Resources Bank
 Arab Sudanese Bank
 Bank of Khartoum
 Baraka Bank (Sudan)
 Blue Nile Mashreg Bank
 Byblos Bank (Africa)
 Export Development Bank
 Family Bank
 Farmer Commercial Bank 
 Financial Investment Bank
 First Abu Dhabi Bank 
 Fisal Islamic Bank
 Industrial Development Bank
 Ivory Bank - Sudan
 Nileen Bank
 National Bank of Abu Dhabi
 National Bank of Egypt (Khartoum)
 National Bank of Sudan
 Omdurman National Bank
 QNB (Sudan)
 Real Estate Commercial Bank
 Sahil and Sahara Bank (Sudan)
 Saudi Sudanese Bank
 Saving & Social Development Bank
 Sudanese Egyptian bank 
 Sudanese French Bank
 Sudanese Islamic Bank
 Tadamon Islamic Bank
 QIB (Sudan)
 United Capital Bank
 Workers National Bank
 Ziraat Katilim (Sudan)

South Sudan

Central bank

 Bank of South Sudan

Commercial banks

 Buffalo Commercial Bank
 Commercial Bank of Ethiopia
 Equity Bank South Sudan
 International Commercial Bank
 Ivory Bank
 Kenya Commercial Bank (South Sudan)
 Nile Commercial Bank

Swaziland

Central bank
 Central Bank of Swaziland

Commercial banks

 First National Bank (South Africa)
 Nedbank
 Standard Bank
 Swazi Bank

Tanzania

Central bank
 Bank of Tanzania

Commercial banks

 Access Bank plc
 Advans Bank Tanzania
 Akiba Commercial Bank
 Azania Bank
 BancABC
 Bank M
 Bank of Africa
 Barclays Bank
 Citibank
 Commercial Bank of Africa (Tanzania)
 CRDB Bank
 Diamond Trust Bank (Tanzania) Limited
 Ecobank
 Exim Bank (Tanzania)
 FBME Bank
 HBL Pakistan
 I&M Bank (Tanzania)
 International Commercial Bank
 KCB Tanzania
 Mkombozi Commercial Bank
 National Bank of Commerce (Tanzania)
 National Microfinance Bank
 NIC Bank Tanzania
 People's Bank of Zanzibar
 Stanbic Bank
 Standard Chartered Bank
 United Bank for Africa
 Zenith Bank

Registered regional unit banks
 Dar es Salaam Community Bank
 Kilimanjaro Co-operative Bank
 Mwanga Community Bank

Registered financial institutions
 Tanzania Investment Bank
 Tanzania Women Bank Limited

Togo

Central bank
 Central Bank of West African States

Commercial banks
 Banque Atlantique
 Banque Sahélo-Saharienne pour l'Investissement et le Commerce
 Ecobank

Tunisia

Central bank
 Central Bank of Tunisia (Banque Centrale de Tunisie)

Banks
 Amen Bank
 Arab Banking Corporation
 Arab Tunisian Bank
 Attijari Bank
 Banque de l'Habitat
 Banque de Tunisie
 Banque de Tunisie et des Emirats
 Banque Internationale Arabe de Tunisie
 Banque Nationale Agricole
 Banque Zitouna
 Citibank
 Societe Tunisienne de Banque
 Stusid Bank

Uganda

Central bank
 Bank of Uganda

Development banks
 East African Development Bank
 Uganda Development Bank

Investment banks
 Dyer & Blair Investment Bank

Commercial banks

 ABC Bank (Uganda)
 Bank of Africa (Uganda)
 Bank of Baroda (Uganda)
 Barclays Bank of Uganda
 Cairo Bank Uganda
 Centenary Bank
 Citibank Uganda
 Crane Bank
 DFCU Bank
 Diamond Trust Bank (Uganda) Limited
 Ecobank (Uganda)
 Equity Bank Uganda
 Exim Bank (Uganda)
 Fina Bank (Uganda)
 Housing Finance Bank
 KCB Bank Uganda Limited
 Orient Bank
 Stanbic Bank Uganda Limited
 Standard Chartered Uganda
 Tropical Bank
 United Bank for Africa (Uganda)

Licensed credit institutions
 Mercantile Credit Bank
 Opportunity Uganda Limited
 PostBank Uganda

Centrally regulated microfinance institutions
 FINCA Uganda Limited
 Pride Microfinance Limited
 UGAFODE Microfinance Limited
 Uganda Finance Trust Limited

Other microfinance institutions
 BRAC (organisation)
 Catholic Relief Services

Zambia

Central bank
 Bank of Zambia

Commercial banks

 Access Bank Zambia
 BancABC
 Bank of China
 Barclays Banknow Absa Zambia
 Cavmont Bank
 Citibank
 Ecobank
 Finance Bank Zambia Limited
 First Alliance Bank Zambia Limited
 First National Bank (South Africa)
 Indo-Zambia Bank Limited
 Zambia Industrial Commercial Bank
 International Commercial Bank
 Investrust Bank
 Stanbic Bank
 Standard Chartered Bank (Zambia)
 United Bank for Africa
 Zambia National Commercial Bank

Microfinance institution
 FINCA International

Zimbabwe

Central bank
 Reserve Bank of Zimbabwe

Development banks
 African Development Bank

Merchant banks
 First Merchant Bank
 Trust Merchant Bank
 Universal Merchant Bank

Commercial banks and other financial institutions

 Agri Bank
 African Century Bank
 BancABC
 Barclays Bank
 CBZ Bank Limited
 CFX Bank, formerly CFX Bank
 Ecobank Zimbabwe
 FBC Bank
 Genesis Investment Bank
 Metropolitan Bank of Zimbabwe
 NBS Bank
 NED Bank
 NMB Bank
 Peoples Own Savings Bank
 Stanbic Bank
 Standard Chartered Bank (Zimbabwe)
 Steward Bank
 Zb Bank

References

External links

 Overview of Strengths of African Commercial Banks